Festuca (fescue) is a genus of flowering plants belonging to the grass family Poaceae (subfamily Pooideae). The genus is closely related to ryegrass (Lolium), and recent evidence from phylogenetic studies using DNA sequencing of plant mitochondrial DNA shows that the genus lacks monophyly. As a result, plant taxonomists have moved several species, including the forage grasses tall fescue and meadow fescue, from the genus Festuca into the genus Lolium, or alternatively into the segregate genus Schedonorus.

Because the taxonomy is complex, scientists have not determined how many true species belong to the genus, but estimates range from more than 400 to over 640.

Fescue pollen is a significant contributor to hay fever.

Taxonomy

The genus Festuca represents a major evolutionary line of the tribe Poeae. The ancient group has produced various segregates that possess more advanced characteristics than Festuca, including racemose inflorescences and more annual habits.

The word "festuca" is a Latin word meaning "stem" or "stalk" first used by Pliny the Elder to describe a weed. The word Festuca first appears to describe grasses in Dodoens'  "Stirpium historiae pemptades sex, sive libri XXX" in 1583. However, the plant Dodoens described as Festuca altera is truly Bromus secalinus. Other authors before Linnaeus used the name to describe other various species of Bromus. In the first edition of "Genera Plantarum", Linnaeus describes seven species of Festuca, five of which are truly Bromus grasses with the other two being Festuca gigantea and Festuca pratensis. In 1753 the genus is accepted as first being formally described, in Linnaeus' "Species Plantarum". Eleven species were described, with F. ovina being the type species. Of these eleven, one species was Danthonia, one Poa, and one Koeleria. The first major monograph on the genus was Hackel's "Monographia Festucarum Europaearum" in 1882. Since Linnaeus' publications, seven genera have been proposed for groups of perennial fescues and fifteen for annual fescues, all with varying degrees of acceptance. For example, in 1906 the subgenus Vulpia was introduced for North American species. The annual habit and shorter anthers of Vulpia has since been enough to distinguish Vulpia as a separate genus from Festuca.

The taxonomy of the genus is ultimately problematic and controversial, as evidenced by the large number of small genera closely related to Festuca. Often distinguishing species within the genus requires the analysis of highly specific morphological differences on characters such as ovary pubescence or leaf sclerenchyma patterns. This distribution of sclerenchyma tissue is an important distinguishing character between species, and though species can be locally distinguished without analyzing these characteristics, to distinguish the genus as a whole the analysis is necessary.

Description

Festuca grasses are perennial and bisexual plants that are densely to loosely cespitose. Some grasses are rhizomatous, some lack rhizomes, and rarely species are stoloniferous. The culms of the grasses are typically glabrous and smooth, though some species have scabrous culms or culms that are pubescent below the inflorescences. The leaf sheaths range from open to the base to closed to the top. Some species have sheaths that persist over years and typically have deciduous blades, and some species have sheaths that quickly shred into fibers and decay in senescence and typically have blades that are not deciduous. Species lack auricles. The membranous ligules measure  and are typically longest at the margins. The ligules are typically truncate and ciliate, though they can occasionally be acute or erose. The flat and conduplicate leaf blades are involute or convolute and are sometimes glaucous or pruinose. The abaxial surfaces of leaf blades are glabrous or scabrous and occasionally pubescent or puberulent. The adaxial surfaces of leaf blades are typically scabrous, though occasionally are hirsute or puberulent. The abaxial sclerenchyma tissue forms longitudinal strands that vary in presence from the margins and opposite of the midvein to adjacent to some or every lateral vein. These longitudinal strands occasionally merge into interrupted or continuous bands. Bands of confluent strands that reach veins are known as "pillars". The adaxial sclerenchyma tissue sometimes forms strands that are opposite or extend to epidermal veins. Some strands form "girders" together with the abaxial sclerenchyma tissue that connect epidermides at some or all veins.

The inflorescences of species are open or contracted panicles, occasionally racemes, with one to two (rarely three) branches at their lower node. The branches are erect and begin to spread during anthesis, and occasionally lower branches are reflexed. The spikelets have two to twelve mostly bisexual florets. The rachillas are typically either scabrous or pubescent, but can occasionally be smooth and glabrous. The subequal or unequal glumes are ovate to lanceolate, acute to acuminate, and are typically exceeded by the florets. The lower glumes are as long or shorter than their adjacent lemmas and have one (rarely two or three) veins, and the upper glumes have three (rarely four or five) veins. The calli are typically glabrous and smooth, but can be occasionally scabrous or rarely pubescent. The chartaceous or sometimes coriaceous lemmas have somewhat dorsally rounded and distally keeled bases. The lemmas typically have five (rarely six or seven) veins. The lemmas have acute to attenuate apices that are occasionally doubly pointed, and terminal awns or mucros. The bidentate paleas are shorter to longer than the lemmas, with scabrous-ciliate veins. The regions between the veins are smooth and glabrous near the base of the paleas and become scabrous or puberulent distally. All grasses have three anthers. The ovaries are glabrous with occasionally hispidulous apices on which hairs persist when ovaries become caryopses. The oblong caryopses have adaxial grooves. The linear hila vary in length from half as long to as long as the caryopses.

Uses
Some fescues are used as ornamental and turf grasses and as pasture and hay for livestock, being a highly nutritious stock feed. Festuca rubra and F. rubra subsp. commutata are used as lawn grasses, and these species, F. arundinacea, and F. trachyphylla are used in parks, deforested areas, and sports fields for land stabilization. F. saximontana and F. idahoensis are used as rangeland grasses for livestock, and fescues often provide good forage for native wildlife. F. ovina and its various subspecies are the most important grazing fescues for North America, and F. arundinacea is one of the most important hay and pasture grasses in Europe. Fescue is easily established on bare ground, outcompeting other plants and persisting over several years, and so is often used in soil erosion control programs. Tall fescue (F. arundinacea) is good for this purpose, and one cultivar, 'Kentucky 31', was used in land reclamation during the Dust Bowl of the 1930s in the US. Fescues have been used as building material, as rope and as a variety of other things in indigenous Ethiopian communities, in particular the Guassa Community Conservation Area where it is referred to as 'Guassa Grass'. The grasses F. amethystina, F. cinerea, F. elegans, F. glauca, and F. pallens are all grown as ornamentals.

Fescue is sometimes used as feed for horses. However, fescue poisoning, caused by ergot alkaloids produced by the endophytic fungus Epichloë coenophiala, is a risk for pregnant mares. During the last three months of pregnancy fescue poisoning increases the risk of spontaneous abortion, stillbirths, retained placenta, absent milk production, and prolonged pregnancy. Incorporating legumes into the fescue can be a way to increase livestock gains and conception rates, even if the fescue is infected.

Infrageneric ranks
Infrageneric ranks: 

 Festuca sect. Amphigenes	(Janka) Tzvelev
 Festuca sect. Aristulatae	E.B. Alexeev	
 Festuca subg. Asperifolia	E.B. Alexeev 1981
 Festuca sect. Atropis	(Trin.) 1936
 Festuca sect. Aulaxyper	Dumort.
 Festuca subg. Austrofestuca	Tzvelev	1971
 Festuca sect. Banksia	E.B. Alexeev 1984
 Festuca [unranked] Bovinae Fr. ex Andersson 1852
 Festuca sect. Bovinae	(Fr. ex Andersson) Hack. 1882
 Festuca sect. Breviaristatae	Krivot.	1960
 Festuca sect. Bromochloa	Drejer

Species

Species include:

Festuca abyssinica
Festuca actae
Festuca alatavica
Festuca aloha – aloha fescue
Festuca alpina – alpine fescue
Festuca altaica – northern rough fescue, Altai fescue
Festuca altissima – wood fescue
Festuca amethystina – tufted fescue
Festuca ampla
Festuca amplissima
Festuca arenaria – rush-leaf fescue
Festuca argentina
Festuca arizonica – Arizona fescue, pinegrass
Festuca armoricana
Festuca arundinacea – tall fescue
Festuca arvernensis – field fescue
Festuca baffinensis – Baffin Island fescue
Festuca beckeri
Festuca brachyphylla – alpine fescue, rock fescue
Festuca breviglumis –  Swallen
Festuca brunnescens
Festuca burnatii
Festuca caerulescens
Festuca caldasii
Festuca californica – California fescue
Festuca callieri
Festuca calligera – southwestern fescue
Festuca campestris – mountain rough fescue
Festuca caprina
Festuca chimborazensis
Festuca cinerea
Festuca circinata
Festuca contracta – tufted fescue
Festuca cretacea
Festuca cumminsii
Festuca dahurica
Festuca dasyclada – oil shale fescue
Festuca densipaniculata
Festuca dimorpha
Festuca djimilensis
Festuca dolichophylla
Festuca donax
Festuca drymeja
 
Festuca durissima
Festuca earlei – Earle's fescue
Festuca edlundiae - Edlund's fescue
Festuca elegans
Festuca elmeri – coast fescue
Festuca eskia
Festuca extremiorientalis
Festuca filiformis – fine-leaved sheep's fescue
Festuca flacca
Festuca frederikseniae 
Festuca gautieri – bearskin fescue
Festuca gigantea – giant fescue
Festuca glacialis
Festuca glauca – blue fescue, gray fescue
Festuca glumosa
Festuca gracillima
Festuca hallii – plains rough fescue
Festuca hawaiiensis – Hawaii fescue
Festuca heterophylla – various-leaved fescue, shade fescue
Festuca hyperborea – boreal fescue 
Festuca hystrix
Festuca idahoensis – Idaho fescue, blue bunchgrass
Festuca indigesta
Festuca jubata – Macaronesia fescue
Festuca juncifolia 
Festuca kingii – spike fescue
Festuca komarovii
Festuca kurtziana
Festuca laxa
Festuca lemanii – confused fescue
Festuca lenensis – tundra fescue
Festuca ligulata – Guadalupe fescue
Festuca litvinovii
Festuca longifolia – blue fescue
Festuca longipes
Festuca lucida
Festuca magellanica
Festuca mairei – Atlas fescue
Festuca matthewsii – alpine fescue tussock
Festuca minutiflora – smallflower fescue
Festuca molokaiensis – Moloka'i fescue
Festuca monticola
Festuca muelleri
Festuca multinodis
Festuca nigrescens – alpine Chewing's fescue
Festuca novae-zealandiae – fescue tussock
Festuca occidentalis – western fescue
Festuca octoflora
Festuca orthophylla
Festuca ovina – sheep's fescue
Festuca pallens
Festuca pallescens
Festuca panciciana

Festuca paradoxa – cluster fescue
Festuca parciflora
Festuca perennis– (historical) perennial and Italian ryegrass
Festuca petraea – Azorean fescue
Festuca picturata
Festuca pilgeri
Festuca polycolea
Festuca porcii
Festuca pratensis – meadow fescue, English bluegrass
Festuca procera
Festuca psammophila
Festuca pseudodalmatica
Festuca pseudodura
Festuca pseudoeskia
Festuca pseudovina – pseudovina
Festuca pulchella
Festuca punctoria
Festuca purpurascens
Festuca pyrenaica
Festuca quadriflora
Festuca richardsonii – arctic fescue
Festuca riccerii
Festuca rigescens
Festuca rivularis
Festuca rubra – red fescue
Festuca rubra subsp. commutata – Chewing's fescue
Festuca rupicaprina
Festuca rupicola – furrowed fescue
Festuca saximontana – Rocky Mountain fescue
Festuca scabra – munnik fescue
Festuca scabriuscula
Festuca scariosa
Festuca sclerophylla
Festuca sibirica
Festuca sinensis
Festuca sodiroana
Festuca sororia – ravine fescue
Festuca spectabilis
Festuca stricta
Festuca subulata – bearded fescue
Festuca subuliflora – crinkle-awn fescue
Festuca subulifolia
Festuca subverticillata – nodding fescue
Festuca tatrae
Festuca thurberi – Thurber's fescue
Festuca trachyphylla
Festuca vaginalis
Festuca vaginata
Festuca valesiaca – Volga fescue
Festuca varia
Festuca venusta
Festuca versuta – Texas fescue
Festuca violacea
Festuca viridula – green fescue
Festuca vivipara – viviparous fescue
Festuca viviparoidea – northern fescue
Festuca washingtonica – Washington fescue
Festuca weberbaueri
Festuca xanthina
Festuca yalaensis

Subgenus Schedonorus
Proposed for inclusion in genus Lolium
Festuca arundinacea (syn. Festuca elatior, Lolium arundinaceum) – tall fescue
Festuca gigantea (Lolium giganteum) – giant fescue
Festuca mazzettiana (Lolium mazzettianum)
Festuca pratensis (Lolium pratensis) – meadow fescue

References

External links
University of Arizona Extension Service, flora and fauna image gallery

 
Poaceae genera
Grasses of Africa
Grasses of Asia
Grasses of Europe
Grasses of North America
Grasses of Oceania
Grasses of South America
Pooideae
Taxa named by Carl Linnaeus